Kirkby Head is a sheer coastal outcrop on Tange Promontory in Enderby Land, Antarctica, which is claimed by Australia as part of the Australian Antarctic Territory. Continental ice reaches almost to the top on its southern side. It is located at the east side of the entrance to Alasheyev Bight.

Discovery and naming
Kirkby Head was plotted from air photographs taken from an Australian National Antarctic Research Expeditions (ANARE) aircraft in 1956, and was first visited by an ANARE party led by Sydney L. Kirkby in November, 1960. It was named by the Antarctic Names Committee of Australia after Kirkby, who was a surveyor at Mawson Station in 1956 and 1960.

See also
 History of Antarctica
 List of Antarctic expeditions

References

External links
 Australian Antarctic Names and Medals Committee (AANMC)
 Australian Antarctic Gazetteer
 Scientific Committee on Antarctic Research (SCAR)
 PDF Map of the Australian Antarctic Territory
 Mawson Station

Headlands of Enderby Land